Zikanyrops is a genus of moths of the family Dalceridae.

Species
 Zikanyrops dubiosa Hopp, 1928
 Zikanyrops sparsa Hopp, 1928

References

Dalceridae
Zygaenoidea genera